Yalden's rat (Desmomys yaldeni)  is a species of rodent in the family Muridae, found only in Ethiopia, where its natural habitat is the montane forests. It is threatened by habitat loss.

The rat got its name in honour of Derek Yalden, a zoologist.

References

 Lavrenchenko, L. 2004. Desmomys yaldeni.  2006 IUCN Red List of Threatened Species.  Downloaded on 19 July 2007.

Endemic fauna of Ethiopia
Desmomys
Mammals of Ethiopia
Rodents of Africa
Animals described in 2003
Taxonomy articles created by Polbot